William Arthur Humber  (born September 9, 1949 in Toronto, Ontario) is a Canadian sports historian, author, journalist, environmentalist, and educator.

Personal profile

Humber was born in Toronto, Ontario.  He earned a bachelor of arts degree from the University of Toronto in 1972, and a master's degree in environmental studies from York University in 1975.  Humber began working at Seneca College in 1977, where he served as a department chair, and the director of Eco-Seneca Initiatives, the college's department devoted to environmental educational initiatives.  He retired in December 2018.

Writing

Humber is the author of 13 books on baseball, sports, the environment, and his hometown of Bowmanville, Ontario.

Baseball historian

Humber currently serves as a selector for the Canadian Baseball Hall of Fame, and was a selector for Canada's Sports Hall of Fame and the Clarington Sports Hall of Fame.  In 1989, he was a subject specialist at the Royal Ontario Museum for an exhibit on baseball.  Humber was inducted in the Canadian Baseball Hall of Fame on June 16, 2018.  He was appointed a member of the Order of Canada in 2021.

Books by Humber
 Cheering for the Home Team: The Story of Baseball in Canada, Boston Mills Press (Erin, Ontario), 1983.
 Freewheeling: The Story of Bicycling in Canada, Boston Mills Press, 1986.
 (With Doris Falls) The History of Central Public School in Bowmanville, Josten's (Topeka, KS), 1989.
 Let's Play Ball: Inside the Perfect Game, Lester and Orpen, 1989.
 The Baseball Book and Trophy, Somerville House, 1993.
 The Kids' Soccer Book and Medallion, Somerville House, 1994.
 Diamonds of the North: A Concise History of Baseball in Canada, Oxford University Press (New York, NY), 1995.
 (With John St. James) All I Thought about Was Baseball: Essays on a Canadian Pastime, University of Toronto Press (Toronto), 1996.
 Bowmanville: A Small Town at the Edge, Natural Heritage, 1997.
 A Sporting Chance, Dundurn Press, 2004.
 (With Darryl Humber) Let it Snow: Keeping Canada's Winter Sports Alive, Dundurn Press, 2009.
 (With Velma Grover and Gail Krantzberg) The Regeneration Imperative: Revitalization of Built and Natural Assets, CRC Press, 2016.
 (With Bradley Humber) Soccer Triumphant, St. Johann Press, 2022.

References

1949 births
Living people
Sports historians
Baseball writers
University of Toronto alumni
York University alumni
Writers from Toronto
Canadian people of English descent
Canadian Baseball Hall of Fame inductees
Baseball in Canada
Members of the Order of Canada
People from Clarington
Academic staff of Seneca College